Progress is an unincorporated community in Pike County, Mississippi.

History
A post office called Progress was established in 1937, and remained in operation until 1955. The community advocated progressive education at the local schoolhouse, hence the name.

References

Unincorporated communities in Pike County, Mississippi
Unincorporated communities in Mississippi